

Buildings and structures

Buildings
 1070 – Nidaros Cathedral in Trondheim, Norway, begun.
 1070 – Rebuilding of Canterbury Cathedral in England following a fire.
 1070 – Rebuilding of York Minster in England begins.
 1070 – Construction of Dudley Castle in England by Ansculf de Picquigny begins.
 1070 – Construction of Richmond Castle in Yorkshire, England begins.
 1072 – Construction of Lincoln Cathedral in England begins.
 1075 – Würzburg Cathedral reconstruction completed (begun in 1045).
 1075 – Santiago de Compostela Cathedral in Galicia (Spain) begun. Tympanum dated 1078.
 1077 – Abbey of Saint-Étienne, Caen, Normandy consecrated.
 1077 – Current Bayeux Cathedral, Normandy consecrated.
 1077 – Construction of St Albans Cathedral begins in England.
 1077 – Panchkuta Basadi, originally known as Urdhvitilaka (glory of the world), one of the Humcha Jain temples in India, built in the style of Badami Chalukya architecture.
 1078 – Construction of Colchester Castle begins in England under the direction of Bishop Gundulf of Rochester.
 1078 (approx.) – White Tower (Tower of London) begun under the direction of Bishop Gundulf of Rochester.
 1079 – Rebuilding of Winchester Cathedral begun.

References

11th-century architecture
Architecture